Bangbae-dong is a dong, or neighbourhood of the greater Gangnam area Seocho-gu district of the South Korean city of Seoul. Bangbae-dong is divided into 5 different dongs which are Bangbaebon-dong, Bangbae 1-dong, 2-dong, 3-dong and 4-dong. The origin of Bangbae-dong is derived from the name Bangbae, meaning "dong-ri with my back to Mt. Myeon-ri," which rises on the border between Gwanak-gu and Seocho-gu. Bangbae-dong was Bangbae-ri, Sangbuk-myeon, Gwacheon-gun, Gyeonggi-do until the end of the Joseon Dynasty, but became Bangbae-ri, Sindong-myeon, Siheung-gun, Gyeonggi-do in 1914 when the area was confirmed during the Japanese colonial period. It was incorporated into the Seoul Metropolitan Government following the expansion of the Seoul Metropolitan Government's zone in 1963, and became Bangbae-dong to this day. The location is Dong at the western end of Seocho-gu, and it is an area from the intersection of the road from Seoul to Gwacheon City and the southern circulation road to Umyeon Mountain.

Education 
 High Schools
 Seoul Electronic High School
 Dongdeok Women's High School
 Sangmun High School
 Suhmoon Girls' High School
 Middle Schools
 Dongdeok Women's Middle School
 Suhmoon Girls' Middle School
 Isu Middle School
 Elementary Schools
 Bangbae Elementary School
 Banghyeon Elementary School
 Bangil Elementary School
 Isu Elementary School
 Seorae Elementary School

Transportation
 Bangbae Station of 
 Naebang Station of 

See also 
Administrative divisions of South Korea

References 

Neighbourhoods of Seocho District